The Remi River is a river  in the Unorganized North Part of Cochrane District in Northeastern Ontario, Canada. It is in the James Bay drainage basin and is a right tributary of the Kapuskasing River.

Course
The river begins at Outlet Bay on the northwest side of Remi Lake in René Brunelle Provincial Park in geographic Gurney Township and flows north, leaves the park, enters geographic Torrance Township, and reaches its mouth at the Kapuskasing River. The Kapuskasing River flows via the Mattagami River and the Moose River to James Bay.

References

Rivers of Cochrane District